Earlington Heights station is a station on the Metrorail rapid transit system in Brownsville, Florida. This station is located at the intersection of Northwest 21st Avenue and the Airport Expressway (SR 112). The Metrorail Orange Line creation and extension of the metro to Miami International Airport (MIA) began construction from this rail station in May 2009, completed in July 2012. Passenger service between MIA, through Downtown Miami, and to the southern Miami suburb of Kendall opened in Summer 2012.

Station layout

The station has two tracks served by an island platform.

Places of interest
Miami International Airport (via the Orange Line)
Brownsville
Allapattah
Historic Miami Jackson High School
Earlington Heights Elementary

References

External links

MDT – Metrorail Stations
 entrance from Google Maps Street View

Green Line (Metrorail)
Orange Line (Metrorail)
Metrorail (Miami-Dade County) stations in Miami-Dade County, Florida
Railway stations in the United States opened in 1984
1984 establishments in Florida